Antillophos candeanus is a species of sea snail, a marine gastropod mollusc in the family Nassariidae, the true whelks.

Description
The length of the shell attains 28.5 mm.

Distribution
This marine species occurs off Guadeloupe.

References

 Petit de la Saussaye S. (1853). Notice sur le genre Phos de Denys de Montfort, avec la description de deux espèces nouvelles. Journal de Conchyliologie. 3: 235–245, pl. 8.

External links
  Rosenberg, G.; Moretzsohn, F.; García, E. F. (2009). Gastropoda (Mollusca) of the Gulf of Mexico, Pp. 579–699 in: Felder, D.L. and D.K. Camp (eds.), Gulf of Mexico–Origins, Waters, and Biota. Texas A&M Press, College Station, Texas

Nassariidae
Gastropods described in 1842